Vasikeri Gopinath also known as V. Gopinath is an Indian politician from Andhra Pradesh, India. He is the leader of the Indian National Congress and has won once as an MLA from the Uravakonda constituency.

Career 
In 1985, he contested as MLA candidate from Uravakonda, but he lost to Gurram Narayanappa of Telugu Desam Party. In 1989, he won as MLA defeating same opponent with 16642 majority.

References 

Year of birth missing (living people)
Indian National Congress politicians from Andhra Pradesh
Members of the Andhra Pradesh Legislative Assembly
People from Anantapur district

People from Rayalaseema
Living people